Definity is a  digital film recorder for motion picture applications, produced by CCG Digital Image Technology, the successor of Agfa-Gevaert's film recorder division.

Launched at NAB in Las Vegas in 2004, Definity marked a departure from previous, more analogue technologies of recording digital sequences onto motion picture film as it utilizes a monochrome high-resolution LCD panel. Before Definity's launch, LCD technology was commonly regarded as unsuitable for film recording purposes, despite its great potential: Main problems were limitations in bit depth, temporary image retention (TIR) and insufficiently saturated colors..

Definity's imaging unit exploits the sub-pixel structure of the LCD to record anamorphic "CinemaScope" material without loss of horizontal image information:  When instead of the standard square pixels the device utilizes its native anamorphic pixels (with an aspect of 3:1), flat widescreen material with a typical aspect ratio of 2.36:1 is horizontal compressed on the LCD, thus arriving at a squeezed, 1.18:1 image required on-film without having to jettison vital image information..

Since 2010 CCG launched a new full LED backlight system to increase the contrast and Density range by using 4320 separate RGB LEDs, increasing speed and Contrast ratio..

See also
Digital intermediate

External links
Definity Official Site

Film and video technology